LMV can refer to:

 Lidköpings Mekaniska Verkstads, an engineering manufacturer in Lidköping, Sweden
 Iveco LMV, a 4WD tactical vehicle
 The ISO 639-3 code for the Lomaiviti language
 Madivaru Airport